The list of ship launches in 1846 includes a chronological list of some ships launched in 1846.

References 

~
Lists of ship launches